Kyoto Now! (stylized as KyotoNOW!) is a student-led movement at colleges and universities across the United States , through which students hope to make American universities commit to reducing carbon dioxide emissions. The name of the movement reflects the Kyoto Protocol, which the USA currently is not considering ratifying.

Cornell University's Kyoto Now!  was the first of such groups formed, after a sit-in protest in then President Rawlings' office.  The group demanded that the University commit "to reducing greenhouse gas emissions by 7 percent below the 1990 levels of emissions by 2007. These reductions are not on a square foot basis, but based on the total campus emissions."  Hal Craft, VP at the time, signed the Protocol, committing the University to emissions reductions, and the school is now on track to meet that commitment through construction of a combined heat and power plant that will take waste heat produced by the cogen plant and use it to heat the campus buildings .

Punk band Bad Religion wrote a song called "Kyoto Now!" for their 2002 album, The Process of Belief, which spoke about the Kyoto Protocol and their opinions on it. It can be considered an anthem for the Kyoto Now! movement. The writer of "Kyoto Now!", Greg Graffin, is, in fact, an alumnus of Cornell University.

Student political organizations